Olivella careorugula is a species of small sea snail, marine gastropod mollusk in the subfamily Olivellinae, in the family Olividae, the olives.  Species in the genus Olivella are commonly called dwarf olives.

Description
The length of the shell attains 5.2 mm.

Distribution
This marine species occurs off Southeast Brazil.

References

 Pimenta, A.D. & Simone, L.R.L. (2021). Morphology of two deep-sea Olivella from the southwestern Atlantic, with a record of a radula-less Olivellinae species (Neogastropoda: Olivoidea: Olividae). Archiv für Molluskenkunde. 150(1): 31-43.

External links
 Absalão, R. S. & Pimenta, A. D. (2003). A new subgenus and three new species of Brazilian deep water Olivella Swainson, 1831 (Mollusca, Gastropoda, Olivellidae) collected by the RV Marion Dufresne in 1987. Zoosystema. 25 (2): 177-185

careorugula
Gastropods described in 2003